Antarctica is a 2020 American romantic comedy film written and directed by Keith Bearden and starring Chloe Levine and Kimie Muroya.

Cast
Chloe Levine as Kat
Kimie Muroya as Janet
Steve Lipman as Stevie D
Damian Young as Dr. Blake
Bubba Weiler as Rian
Clea Lewis as Diane
Laith Nakli as Vlad
Ajay Naidu as Principal Pepp
Jojo Gonzalez as Jaime Jimenez

Release
The film was released on December 4, 2020.

Reception
The film has an 86% rating on Rotten Tomatoes based on seven reviews.

John DeFore of The Hollywood Reporter gave the film a positive review and wrote "...Keith Bearden’s take on a teen-comedy model that always lives or dies by its stars’ chemistry."

Bradley Gibson of Film Threat rated the film a 9 out of 10, calling it "a rare gem that stands as one of this year’s best."

References

External links
 
 

2020s English-language films